Rebirth of Soul is the eighth studio album by American recording artist Syleena Johnson. It was released by Shanachie Records on November 10, 2017 in the United States. Produced by Johnson's father Syl Johnson, who chose its songs and assembled a group of crack session players from the 1960s and 1970s, Rebirth of Soul is a cover album that comprises songs R&B, soul and rock songs of these eras.

Track listing

External links
 Official website

Syleena Johnson albums
2017 albums
Covers albums
Shanachie Records albums